Walter Bartel (15 September 1904 – 16 January 1992) was a German communist resistance fighter, historian and university professor.

Life 
Born in Fürstenberg/Havel, Bartel grew up in a working-class family. Wilhelm Bartel, his father, worked in forestry.

Walter Bartel trained to be a merchant after attending Volksschule and Realschule. He joined the Young Communist League of Germany (KJVD) in 1920 (the same year it was created) and joined the Communist Party of Germany (KPD) in 1923. In 1927 he led the German delegation to the International Youth Congress in Moscow. In 1929 he began to study Marxism-Leninism at the Moscow International Lenin School and achieved the degree of Aspirantur there.

He returned to Germany in 1932. Here he participated in political resistance to the rising power of Fascism. On account of this illegal activity, he was charged with "Preparation for Treason" and sentenced to 27 months in a Zuchthaus, which he served from 1933 to 1935 at Brandenburg-Görden Prison. After his release, he emigrated to Czechoslovakia, but there he was expelled from the KDP for alleged treason.

In March 1939, the German occupying force arrested him and transported him to Buchenwald concentration camp. At Buchenwald, Bartel was employed by the Carpentry labourers and the department of labour statistics. Along with Ernst Busse and Harry Kuhn, he soon became part of the illegal party leadership at Buchenwald and, from 1943, he was the chairman of the International Camp Committee, which worked to co-ordinate resistance and escape attempts in the camp. When the approaching American troops enabled the liberation of the camp, he was recognised by the American camp commandants too as the equivalent of a rightful leader of the former camp.

After 1945 he was rehabilitated by the KDP (after several review procedures) and became a founding member of the Socialist Unity Party of Germany (SED). After a short stint as Head of Department for Popular Education for the Magistrat of Berlin, he became the personal advisor of Wilhelm Pieck for party activities. In 1953 he was investigated by the party again. After this he moved to academic work. He received a doctorate and became professor of Twentieth Century History at Leipzig University. From 1957 to 1962 he was Director of the Deutsches Institut für Zeitgeschichte (DIZ). After that he took up a lectureship in Twentieth Century History at Humboldt University in Berlin. In 1965 he became prorector for student affairs and in 1967 he received a chair. From the 1970s he was deeply involved in the affairs of Buchenwald survivors and was Chairman of the Buchenwald Committee and a board member of the Committee of Anti-Fascist Resistance. From 1970 he was Deputy Chairman of the Internationalen Komitee Buchenwald-Dora und Kommandos.

As a historian he produced works on the anti-Fascist resistance of the left wing of the SDP, a standard work on the history of Buchenwald and on the Chairman of the KDP, Ernst Thälmann.

Walter Bartel and a small group of like-minded individuals sought to establish historical seminars and institutes in the DDR which conformed to the SED's regulations. The "Guild" of DDR Historians was not initially in the Marxist tradition. According to Lothar Mertens, Walter Bartel (like Horst Bartel, Karl Bittel, Rudolf Lindau und Albert Schreiner) lacked the necessary skill and rigour to sufficiently distance his academic output from the category of "mere" party propaganda.

Honours 
 1964 Patriotic Order of Merit, Silver
 1964 Johannes R. Becher-Medal
 1969 Patriotic Order of Merit, Gold
 1974 Order of Karl Marx
 1979 Medal of the Soviet Committee of War Veterans
 1984 Star of People's Friendship

References

Bibliography 
 Lutz Niethammer: Der "gesäuberte Antifaschismus". Die SED und die kommunistischen Kapos von Buchenwald. Berlin 1994
 Harry Stein, Gedenkstätte Buchenwald (Ed.): Konzentrationslager Buchenwald 1937–1945. Begleitband zur ständigen historischen Ausstellung, Wallstein Verlag, Göttingen 1999, .
 Philipp Neumannn: "… eine Sprachregelung zu finden". Zur Kanonisierung des kommunistischen Buchenwald-Gedächtnisses in der Dokumentation Mahnung und Verpflichtung, in: Fritz Bauer Institut, Katharina Stengel (Ed.): Opfer als Akteure, Interventionen ehemaliger NS-Verfolgter in der Nachkriegszeit, Frankfurt (Main) 2008, pp. 151–173.

External links 

 

 Photo of Walter Bartel

Buchenwald concentration camp survivors
International Lenin School alumni
Communist Party of Germany politicians
Union of Persecutees of the Nazi Regime members
Academic staff of the Humboldt University of Berlin
Academic staff of Leipzig University
East German people
1904 births
1992 deaths
20th-century German historians
German Marxist historians
People from Oberhavel